Courtney Holtkamp (born 25 April 1999) is a Canadian rugby union player.

In 2020, Holtkamp signed with Loughborough Lightning for the Premier 15s 2020–21 season. She plays for the Red Deer Titans and has appeared for the University of Alberta Pandas. She debuted for Canada at the age of 18 against England on November 2017 at Allianz Park.

Holtkamp competed for Canada at the delayed 2021 Rugby World Cup in New Zealand. She played against the Eagles in their quarterfinal encounter. She also started in the semifinal against England, and in the third place final against France.

References

External links 

 Courtney Holtkamp at Canada Rugby

Living people
1999 births
Female rugby union players
Canadian female rugby union players
Canada women's international rugby union players